Never Trust a Woman is a 1930 German musical film directed by Max Reichmann and starring Richard Tauber, Paul Hörbiger and Werner Fuetterer. It premiered on 3 February 1930.
No prints of this early sound-film are known to have survived, though the complete soundtrack on Tri-Ergon Discs, each synchronized to accompany one reel of the film, has recently been discovered in the Jewish Museum in Berlin. A brief clip has been posted on-line, and it is hoped that (after restoration) it will be issued in full.

It was shot at the Bavaria Studios in Munich.

Cast
 Richard Tauber as Stefan
 Paul Hörbiger as Joachim
 Werner Fuetterer as Peter
 Maria Matray as Katja
 Agnes Schulz-Lichterfeld as Die Mutter
 Gustaf Gründgens as Jean
 Edith Karin as Rote Finna
 Sven Sandberg as Singer

References

Bibliography

External links

1930 films
Films of the Weimar Republic
1930 musical films
German musical films
1930s German-language films
Films directed by Max Reichmann
Seafaring films
Films about prostitution in Germany
Lost German films
German black-and-white films
Films scored by Paul Dessau
Bavaria Film films
1930 lost films
1930s German films
Films shot at Bavaria Studios